San Francisco Lachigoló is a town and municipality in Oaxaca in south-western Mexico. The municipality covers an area of 31.9 km². 
It is part of the Tlacolula District in the east of the Valles Centrales Region.

As of 1998, the municipality had a total population of 1,920.

References

Municipalities of Oaxaca